Oak Grove (formerly Oakgrove) is an unincorporated community in Springdale Township of northern Washington County, Arkansas, United States. It is located on the northwest side of Springdale just east of the combined U.S. routes 62, 71, 540.

References

Unincorporated communities in Washington County, Arkansas
Unincorporated communities in Arkansas